Elhadji Pape Diaw (born 31 December 1994) is a Senegalese professional footballer who plays as a defender for French  club Laval. He is also under contract with Ukrainian Premier League club Rukh Lviv, but that contract is suspended.

Club career
After fours years in Senegal, Pape Diaw went through Geel and Korona Kielce before signing a two-year contract with Angers SCO in January 2019.

On 27 June 2019, he was loaned one season-long to Ligue 2 club Caen.

On 22 February 2021, he signed for Lithuanian champions Žalgiris.  He left the club on 23 January 2022.

Shortly after, he signed with Ukrainian side Rukh Lviv. After the Russian invasion of Ukraine, his contract was suspended under new FIFA rules, which allowed players to sign with clubs outside Ukraine until 30 June 2022. On 21 March 2022, he returned to Poland, signing a short-term deal with I liga club Arka Gdynia.

On 20 June 2022, he was loaned to French Ligue 2 side Laval.

International career
He made his debut for the Senegal national football team on 26 March 2019 in a friendly against Mali, as a starter.

Honours

Žalgiris
 A Lyga: 2021

References

External links
 
 
 
 Elhadji Pape Diaw at Angers SCO
 

1994 births
Living people
Footballers from Dakar
Association football defenders
Senegalese footballers
Senegalese expatriate footballers
Senegal international footballers
Ekstraklasa players
Ligue 1 players
Ligue 2 players
Championnat National 3 players
A Lyga players
I liga players
ASC Jeanne d'Arc players
Korona Kielce players
Angers SCO players
Stade Malherbe Caen players
FK Žalgiris players
FC Rukh Lviv players 
Arka Gdynia players
Stade Lavallois players
Expatriate footballers in Belgium
Expatriate footballers in Poland
Expatriate footballers in France
Expatriate footballers in Lithuania
Expatriate footballers in Ukraine
Senegalese expatriate sportspeople in Belgium
Senegalese expatriate sportspeople in Poland
Senegalese expatriate sportspeople in France
Senegalese expatriate sportspeople in Lithuania
Senegalese expatriate sportspeople in Ukraine